Hubert George de Burgh-Canning, 2nd Marquess of Clanricarde (30 November 1832 – 12 April 1916), styled Lord Hubert de Burgh until 1862, Lord Hubert de Burgh-Canning until 1867, and Viscount Bourke until 1874, was an Anglo-Irish ascendancy nobleman, millionaire, and politician who was the grandson of British Prime Minister George Canning.

Early life
Hubert was the son of Ulick de Burgh, 1st Marquess of Clanricarde and his wife, Harriet, daughter of British Prime Minister George Canning. He was an Attache in Turin in 1852 and rose to become Second Secretary there in 1862. He assumed the surname Canning after inheriting the estates of his uncle, Earl Canning.

After the death of his elder brother, Lord Dunkellin, who had been Liberal MP for Galway County from 1865 until his death in 1867, Hubert succeeded in becoming heir to both the Marquessate and also to his brother's seat. He was elected as the Liberal MP for Galway County in 1867, re-elected in 1868, and retired in 1871. After his brother's death in 1867 and before succeeding his father as Marquess in 1874, Hubert was known by the courtesy title, Viscount Bourke, which was one of his father's other subsidiary titles.

Career
Hubert de Burgh-Canning was unmourned in Ireland, where he had a reputation as one of the worst and most repressive absentee landlords in the country. His estate centred on Portumna, County Galway spanned a mainly agricultural  (81 sq mi) (about 3.5% of this second-largest county), yielding about an average of £25,000 during his lifetime yearly in rents paid by 1,900 largely poorly agriculturally equipped and housed tenants, and was a main target during the 1887 Plan of Campaign fought for fair rents by the Irish Parliamentary Party.

Clanricarde's opposition to the plan was so obdurate (strong) that an Irish minister commented: "... what right has Clanricarde to be treated better than a lunatic or an orphan?" His land agent John Henry Blake was murdered in 1882. In 1888 the Earl wrote to Chief Secretary Balfour "the western Irish cannot be kept up to their contracts without the threat of eviction".

Upon the suggestion of Arthur Balfour, the Irish members of parliament submitted a bill to parliament for the expropriation of his estates. The Prime Minister, Sir Henry Campbell-Bannerman approved the bill and denounced Clanricarde in parliament in a way described as 'scathing'. Never had Clanicarde visited his estates, despite the many thousands of families that had been evicted from them during that time, resulting in mass destitution. "So universal is the execration in which this particular nobleman is held by people of every political party that when the question of this bill was put to the vote by the speaker, liberals, liberal unionists and conservatives all voted with the Irish party, only three of the nearly 700 members of the House of Commons opposing the vote, which would otherwise have been unanimous."

From 1891 onwards the Congested Districts Board attempted to compulsorily purchase the estate but were not successful until 1915.

Death
He died in 1916, aged 83, a resident of 13 Hanover Square, London, and was buried on the west side of Highgate Cemetery, London. At his death, his vast fortune devolved upon his sister's grandson, Henry, Viscount Lascelles, who in 1919 went on to marry Mary, Princess Royal.

Upon his death, his peerages became extinct, save the second creation of the earldom of Clanricarde, which passed by special remainder to the 6th Marquess of Sligo.

Arms

Ancestry

References

|-

1832 births
1916 deaths
19th-century Anglo-Irish people
Irish Anglicans
Burgh-Canning, Hubert de
Burgh-Canning, Hubert de
Burgh-Canning, Hubert de
UK MPs who inherited peerages
Politicians from County Galway
Hubert
Burials at Highgate Cemetery
Marquesses of Clanricarde
British landlords